Stadionul 1 Mai is a multi-use stadium in Slatina, Olt County and is currently used mostly for football matches, being the home ground of CSM Slatina since 2017. In the past it was also the home ground of Oltul Slatina and Inter Olt Slatina. It holds 10,000 people (6,500 on seats).

References

External links
Stadionul 1 Mai at soccerway.com

Football venues in Romania
Buildings and structures in Olt County
Slatina, Romania
1924 establishments in Romania